HMS Bermuda was an 18-gun sloop of the Royal Navy.

Bermuda was built in Bermuda of Bermuda cedar in 1805, as the lead ship of her class. Bermuda only spent three years in service before being wrecked on Memory Rock, Little Bermuda, on 22 April 1808.

Bermuda was searching for a rich Portuguese ship when she hit a reef during the night. Next morning Byam sighted a ship aground about five miles away. She proved to be Concepcion, the vessel they were looking for Bermuda could not be freed from the reef, but Conception could be. Byam and his crew captured the Portuguese ship, which they sailed on 26 April to New Providence, arriving on 4 May. Before they sailed they left a lieutenant, a midshipman, and six seamen to guard the stores. (Five men also took the opportunity to desert in Bermudas jolly boat.) Rescuers returned to the wreck, salvaging what they could, before abandoning the wreck on 3 June. The court martial attributed the loss to an excessively strong current.

Captain Byam went on to command .

Citations and references

Citations

References
 
 
 

Sloops of the Royal Navy
Shipwrecks in the Caribbean Sea
1805 ships
Ships built in Bermuda
Maritime incidents in 1808
Military of Bermuda